Mohsen Bayatinia (born April 9, 1980 in Abadan) is a former Iranian football player and coach.

Club career

Club career statistics

 Assist Goals

International career
He was a member of Iran national football team at the West Asian Football Federation Championship 2002. He was also a member of Iran Under-23 team that won the Gold Medal at the 2002 Asian Games in Busan. He scored Iran's winning goal at the final against Japan.

References

Iranian footballers
Iran international footballers
Association football forwards
Iranian expatriate footballers
Pas players
Paykan F.C. players
Esteghlal F.C. players
Saba players
Sanat Mes Kerman F.C. players
Persian Gulf Pro League players
People from Abadan, Iran
1980 births
Living people
Asian Games gold medalists for Iran
Asian Games medalists in football
Footballers at the 2002 Asian Games
Medalists at the 2002 Asian Games
Sportspeople from Khuzestan province